Mamadou Lamine Sambe (born 15 December 1989) is a Senegalese basketball player.

Professional career
Sambe played for French LNB Pro A league club Pau-Lacq-Orthez during the 2007–2009 seasons.

National team career
Sambe played with the Senegal national basketball team at the 2019 FIBA Basketball World Cup.

References

1989 births
Living people
2019 FIBA Basketball World Cup players
ADA Blois Basket 41 players
ALM Évreux Basket players
Black French sportspeople
Champagne Châlons-Reims Basket players
Élan Béarnais players
French men's basketball players
Senegalese men's basketball players
Sportspeople from Orléans